United Nations Security Council Resolution 1982, adopted unanimously on May 17, 2011, after recalling all previous resolutions on the situation in Sudan, the Council extended the mandate of an expert panel monitoring the arms embargo and other sanctions against the country until February 19, 2012.

Observations
The Security Council recalled a report by the expert panel and determined the situation in Sudan to remain a threat to international peace and security in the region.

Acts
Acting under Chapter VII of the United Nations Charter, the Council reaffirmed the importance of measures set out in previous resolutions, including Resolution 1945 (2010). It decided to extend the mandate of the expert panel–established in Resolution 1591 (2005)–monitoring sanctions against Sudan, including an arms embargo, until February 19, 2012.

The panel was required to provide a report to the Council 30 days before the end of its mandate.

See also
 African Union – United Nations Hybrid Operation in Darfur
 List of United Nations Security Council Resolutions 1901 to 2000 (2009–2011)
 Second Sudanese Civil War
 War in Darfur

References

External links
 
Text of the Resolution at undocs.org

 1982
2011 in Sudan
 1982
May 2011 events